Macapá-Alberto Alcolumbre International Airport  is the airport serving Macapá, Brazil. Since April 22, 2009 the airport is named after Alberto Alcolumbre, a local businessman.

During a transitional period, the airport is jointly operated by Infraero and Consortium Novo Norte.

History
The airport was opened in 1970.

Because of the Free Trade Zone of Macapá and Santana, regulated by the Federal Law 8.387, of December 30, 1991 at Macapá International Airport anyone, passengers (domestic and international) or visitors, can purchase goods at the Duty Free Shops.

On April 12, 2019 a new terminal was opened replacing an older facility. Following its closure, the old terminal was demolished to make room for an enlarged apron.

Previously operated by Infraero, on August 18, 2022 the consortium Novo Norte formed by the Brazilian companies Socicam and Dix won a 30-year concession to operate the airport.

Airlines and destinations

Incident
4 July 1970: a Cruzeiro do Sul NAMC YS-11 en route from Belém-Val de Cans to Macapá was hijacked by 1 person and flown to Cayenne, Georgetown, Trinidad and Tobago, Antigua and Jamaica.

Access

See also

List of airports in Brazil

References

External links

Airports in Amapá
Airports established in 1970
Macapá